A list of films produced by the Marathi language film industry based in Maharashtra in the year 2000.

2000 Releases
A list of Marathi films released in 2000.

References

Lists of 2000 films by country or language
 Marathi
2000